Idaea obfusaria, the rippled wave, is a species of geometrid moth in the family Geometridae.

The MONA or Hodges number for Idaea obfusaria is 7123.

References

Further reading

External links

 

Sterrhini
Articles created by Qbugbot
Moths described in 1861